In addition to the show's regular cast of voice actors, celebrity guest stars have been a staple of The Simpsons, an American animated television sitcom created by Matt Groening for the Fox Broadcasting Company, since its first season. The Simpsons focuses on the eponymous family, which consists of Homer, Marge, Bart, Lisa and Maggie. The family was initially conceived by Groening for a series of animated shorts, which originally aired as a part of The Tracey Ullman Show between 1987 and 1989. The shorts were developed into a half-hour prime time series which began in December 1989. The series' 34th season began on September 25, 2022, and 745 episodes of The Simpsons have aired. A feature film adaptation of the series called The Simpsons Movie, was released in 2007.

Guest voices have come from a wide range of professions, including actors, athletes, authors, musicians, artists, politicians and scientists. In the show's early years most guest stars voiced original characters, but as the show has continued the number of those appearing as themselves has increased.

The first credited guest star was Marcia Wallace who appeared in "Bart the Genius" in her first stint as Bart's teacher Edna Krabappel. Singer Tony Bennett was the first guest star to appear as himself, appearing briefly in the season two episode "Dancin' Homer". Several guest stars have featured as recurring characters on the show, including Phil Hartman, Joe Mantegna and Kelsey Grammer. After Wallace, Hartman made the most appearances, guest starring 52 times. Mantegna has appeared over forty times, Grammer, Maurice LaMarche, Jon Lovitz and Frank Welker have appeared twenty times or more; Albert Brooks, Glenn Close and Jackie Mason have appeared ten or more times, while Michael Dees, Dana Gould, Terry W. Greene, Valerie Harper, Jan Hooks, Jane Kaczmarek, Stacy Keach, Kipp Lennon, J. K. Simmons, Sally Stevens, George Takei and Michael York have made over five appearances.

Three guest stars, Ricky Gervais, Seth Rogen and Pete Holmes, earned writing credits for the episodes in which they appeared. Grammer, Mason and three-time guest star Anne Hathaway all won the Primetime Emmy Award for Outstanding Voice-Over Performance for guest voice roles on the show. The show was awarded the Guinness World Record for "Most Guest Stars Featured in a TV Series" in 2010. As of March 19, 2023, there have been 953 guest stars on the show, with this figure rising to 957 if The Simpsons Movie is included.

History
Guest stars have appeared on The Simpsons since its first season, in addition to the show's main cast of Dan Castellaneta, Julie Kavner, Nancy Cartwright, Yeardley Smith, Hank Azaria and Harry Shearer and supporting cast of Tress MacNeille, Pamela Hayden, Maggie Roswell, Chris Edgerly, Dawnn Lewis, Grey DeLisle, Alex Désert, Eric Lopez, Jenny Yokobori, Kimberly D. Brooks, Tony Rodríguez, Melanie Minichino, Jonathan Lipow and former supporting cast members Jo Ann Harris, Russi Taylor, Christopher Collins, Susan Blu, Lona Williams, Doris Grau, Karl Wiedergott and Marcia Mitzman Gaven. Kevin Michael Richardson started as a recurring guest star in the twenty first season, but joined the supporting cast in the twenty eighth, starting with the episode "The Last Traction Hero".

Guest voices have come from a wide range of professions, including actors, athletes, authors, musicians, artists, politicians and scientists. In the earlier seasons, most of the guest stars voiced characters, but eventually more started appearing as themselves. The first male guest star was actor Sam McMurray, who voiced a worker at the Springfield Nuclear Power Plant in "Homer's Odyssey", the show's third episode, and Marcia Wallace was the first female guest star on the show starting from "Bart the Genius" as Edna Krabappel and Ms. Melon. Singer Tony Bennett was the first guest star to appear as himself, appearing in the season two episode "Dancin' Homer" while Aerosmith were the first band with their cameo in the third season's "Flaming Moe's"

Several guest stars have made multiple appearances on the show, often as recurring characters. Actress Marcia Wallace guest starred 176 times, making her the most recurring female guest star on the show, until her death in 2013. Edna Krabappel was then retired from the show, but sometimes appears as a ghost, and actor Phil Hartman guest-starred in 52 episodes, more than any other male actor, although his initial role in the second season episode "Bart Gets Hit by a Car" in 1991 was intended to be a one-off. He voiced the recurring characters Troy McClure and Lionel Hutz as well as numerous other one-time characters, until his death in 1998. McClure and Hutz were subsequently retired from the show. Actor Kelsey Grammer first appeared as Sideshow Bob in the first-season episode "Krusty Gets Busted" while actor Joe Mantegna made his first appearance as Fat Tony in the third season episode "Bart the Murderer". The two have appeared in 21 and 28 episodes respectively; Mantegna also appeared in the film. Both roles were originally written for other actors: Bob was originally to be voiced by James Earl Jones, who later guest starred three times on the show, while Fat Tony was written for Sheldon Leonard. Other repeat guest stars include Albert Brooks, Glenn Close, Jan Hooks, Maurice LaMarche, Jon Lovitz, Jane Kaczmarek, Jackie Mason, Charles Napier and Frank Welker.

According to Groening, guest star choices "come from the writers saying, 'Wouldn't it be cool to have [such a person on the show]?'", while showrunner Al Jean has stated the reasoning is "we want to meet our heroes." Bill Oakley and Josh Weinstein, showrunners of the seventh and eight seasons, favored guest stars with what they felt were unique and interesting voices such as actors R. Lee Ermey, Donald Sutherland, Kirk Douglas and Lawrence Tierney. In 2014, Jean stated that fewer people would be appearing as themselves, as the staff did not want it to become a "crazy roster".

Many guest stars come into the show's recording studio to record their parts, although some are recorded over the telephone. Three guest stars have been credited with writing the episode in which they guest starred. Comedian Ricky Gervais wrote the episode "Homer Simpson, This Is Your Wife", while actor Seth Rogen co-wrote the episode "Homer the Whopper" with Evan Goldberg, and comedian Pete Holmes wrote the two-part "Warrin' Priests" episodes. Two guest stars were credited with pseudonyms. Actor Dustin Hoffman was credited as "Sam Etic" for the episode "Lisa's Substitute" while musician Michael Jackson was credited as "John Jay Smith" for the episode "Stark Raving Dad". After the latter episode, the producers decided that if a celebrity wished to guest star on the show, they had to be willing to be credited under their real name.

Numerous people have rejected the chance to appear on the show. Actor William Shatner has been described as the first person to reject the show. The producers have consistently failed to persuade any former President of the United States to appear. Musicians Bruce Springsteen and Bob Dylan have also rejected multiple invitations to guest star on the series. Other people to turn the show down include actors Michael Caine, Tom Cruise, Clint Eastwood and Anthony Hopkins and director Quentin Tarantino. Musician Prince turned down a role in a sequel to "Stark Raving Dad", which meant the script was never produced.

Others have accepted the offer, but have been unable to record a role. Musician Frank Zappa and actor Anthony Perkins both became too ill to record their parts, while Jim Carrey had to drop out due to time constraints, and Faye Dunaway cancelled. Christopher Walken originally agreed appear as himself in "Insane Clown Poppy". However, he then decided to demand a lot more money than the producers were willing to pay. Instead, Jay Mohr provided the voice of Walken. The end credits state "Jay Mohr as Christopher Walken". This is the first time this has ever been done.

Robby Krieger of The Doors recorded a cameo for the episode "The Great Money Caper", but his part was cut because the writers felt his appearance seemed too forced. The scene was later included on the season's DVD release. Similarly, actress Catherine O'Hara recorded the voice of Colette the waitress in "Flaming Moe's", but was redubbed with Jo Ann Harris who the producers felt was a better fit. Ron Howard, in what would have been his third appearance on The Simpsons, was advertized as guest starring on "Children of a Lesser Clod". However, he did not appear for any recording sessions. Similarly, Werner Herzog was advertized as guest starring in "Thanksgiving of Horror", in what would have been his third appearance as Walter Hotenhoffer, but did not appear in the final episode.

Mason, Grammer and Anne Hathaway have each won the Primetime Emmy Award for Outstanding Voice-Over Performance for their guest voice roles on the show. The show was awarded the Guinness World Record for "Most Guest Stars Featured in a TV Series" on May 23, 2010, with Guinness estimating that the show has featured "at least 555 as of series 21". As of March 19, 2023, there have been 953 guest stars on the show, totaling 1604 guest spots. These figures rise to 957 and 1632 respectively if The Simpsons Movie is counted as well.

Guest stars

 The color of the season number in the first column corresponds to the color of that season's DVD boxset or digital purchase image for the seasons which have not been released in physical format.
 In the No. column:
 The first number refers to the order it aired during the entire series.
 The second number refers to the episode number within its season: i.e. 1506 would be the sixth episode of the fifteenth season.
 The production code refers to the code assigned to the episode by the production team. The first two characters refer to the season the episode was made for. The first season is 7Gxx, the second is 7Fxx, the third is 8Fxx and the fourth is 9Fxx. After that, the fifth season started with 1F and continued in order until season nine (which was 5F). Starting with season ten, the production codes started with AABF, with the first letter changing for each season (i.e. BABF, CABF, etc.). The number at the end of the code is the order in which that episode was produced during that production run.
 Guests with "(archival)" after their names refer to cases where roles were not recorded specifically for the episode, but instead archival audio and/or footage from independent sources was used in the episode. In most cases these appearances have been uncredited and are usually not considered as proper guest stars given the circumstances.

Upcoming scheduled guest stars
The following have been announced as guest stars for upcoming episodes that have not yet aired. This however is subject to change as sometimes in the past announced guest stars have had their appearances cut for time, been removed or replaced, or for some other reason have not appeared in the final episode.

Episodes with * in the No. column are order and airdates tentative to change based on entries in the Entertainment Identifier Registry.
Additionally, the staff have written a part in mind for Dwayne "The Rock" Johnson.

Guest stars with multiple appearances
The following people have guest starred on the show twice or more.

  1   Indicates the figure includes an appearance in The Simpsons Movie
  2   Indicates the figure includes an appearance in the Butterfingers commercials
  3   Indicates the figure includes an appearance in "Do the Bartman" music video
  4   Indicates the figure includes an appearance in a The Simpsons Game
  5   Indicates the figure includes an appearance in "The Simpsons Ride"
  6   Indicates the figure includes an uncredited appearance
  7   Indicates the figure dictates appearances as a recurring guest star up until joining the regular supporting cast

Other media
Beyond the television series and the movie, there have been other media products of The Simpsons where guest stars have provided vocal talents in addition to the regular cast. From music videos, to video games, commercials and theme park rides, the following guest stars have appeared in various Simpsons-related media.

Guest animators
The show has also had several guest animators who will do their own version of the show's opening credits, from just a couch gag to the whole introduction. Starting from the 22nd season, these following guest animators have contributed to the show:

Potential guest stars that did not happen

Notes

Citations

References
 Official episode guide at the Fox website The Simpsons.com. Retrieved March 26, 2012.
 Season 1, 2, 3, 4, 5, 6, 7, 8, 9, 10, 11, 12, 13, 14, 15, 16, 17, 18, 19, 20, 21, 22, 23, 24, 25

External links
 Guest star list at the Internet Movie Database

Simpsons
Guest stars
Simpsons